Andrew Pilgrim (born 18 August 1956 in Nottingham) is a British-born racing driver, who became a United States citizen in 1998. He has competed in the SCCA World Challenge, 24 Hours of Le Mans, 24 Hours of Daytona, and NASCAR.

Racing career
Having taken a keen interest in motorcycles as a child, Pilgrim started racing them as soon as he started a full-time job (computer programmer). He raced them from 1978 to 1980, finishing 2nd in two National Championships (Avon/Bike Magazine Series & Kawasaki 400 Series) & won several Club championships in just two and a half seasons. He accepted a job offer in the USA towards the end of 1980.

Pilgrim was living in England when his job as a computer programmer necessitated a move to the United States. His first foray into racing stateside was with SCCA Autocross. In 1984, Pilgrim borrowed $3,000 to buy a Renault Alliance and began competing with it. He eventually moved up to professional racing in 1986 running the Firebird series. In the late 1980s and early 1990s, Pilgrim ran in the Corvette Challenge series.

Pilgrim made appearances in the 24 Hours of Le Mans in the late 1990s, running for New Hardware Racing, Roock Racing and Corvette Racing. He joined the Chevrolet Corvette factory team in 1999. In 2001 he was selected as teammate for Dale Earnhardt Jr., Dale Earnhardt Sr. and Kelly Collins in the 24 Hours of Daytona and the team finished second in class. After the 24 Hours of Daytona, Dale Earnhardt Sr. promised to someday put Pilgrim in a NASCAR stock-car, a promise he was unable to fulfill due to his death a few weeks later during the 2001 Daytona 500. Pilgrim is the last person to have engaged in conversation with Earnhardt before he died.

From 2004 to 2008, Pilgrim drove for Cadillac in the SPEED World Challenge, winning a championship in 2005. He moved to K-Pax Racing in 2009 and 2010 before returning to Cadillac for another stint that lasted from 2011 to 2014. In 2015, he stepped away from the PWC to run various endurance races. In 2016, Pilgrim joined Black Swan Racing for a four-race endurance schedule, including the 24 Hours of Daytona. The move came after his FIA rating was changed from gold to silver. Pilgrim returned to the World Challenge in 2018 with Blackdog Speed Shop.

In 2007, Pilgrim drove two road course races in the NASCAR Busch Series for JR Motorsports. Pilgrim made his NASCAR Sprint Cup Series debut in 2011 at Infineon Raceway driving the No. 46 for Whitney Motorsports, where he finished 26th.

Personal life
Pilgrim operates a traffic safety foundation.

Motorsports career results

SCCA National Championship Runoffs

24 Hours of Le Mans results

NASCAR
(key) (Bold – Pole position awarded by qualifying time. Italics – Pole position earned by points standings or practice time. * – Most laps led.)

Sprint Cup Series

Busch Series

Complete IMSA SportsCar Championship results
(key) (Races in bold indicate pole position) (Races in italics indicate fastest lap)

† Pilgram did not complete sufficient laps in order to score full points.

References

External links
 
 
 
 Traffic Safety Education Foundation profile
 Automobile magazine page
 Corvette Racing profile
 Blancpain GT profile

1956 births
24 Hours of Daytona drivers
24 Hours of Le Mans drivers
American Le Mans Series drivers
English racing drivers
Rolex Sports Car Series drivers
Living people
NASCAR drivers
Sportspeople from Nottingham
Sportspeople from Boca Raton, Florida
WeatherTech SportsCar Championship drivers
24H Series drivers
Corvette Racing drivers
JR Motorsports drivers
Nürburgring 24 Hours drivers